Corestheta elongata is a species of beetle in the family Cerambycidae. It was described by Broun in 1883, originally under the genus Somatidia. It is known from New Zealand.

References

Dorcadiini
Beetles described in 1883